Isaac LeVesconte (August 12, 1822 – October 26, 1879) was a Nova Scotia businessman and political figure. He represented Richmond in the House of Commons of Canada as a Conservative member from 1869 to 1874.

He was born at Saint Aubin in Jersey in 1822, was educated at Saint Helier, Jersey, and came to Arichat on Isle Madame at the age of 12. LeVesconte worked in his family's company which sold goods to fisherman and imported and exported goods, including dried fish. He was put in charge of the operation at Arichat in 1855. LeVesconte was elected to the Nova Scotia House of Assembly in 1863 for Richmond County and served as financial secretary from 1863 to 1864. He was elected to the House of Commons for the 1st Canadian Parliament in an 1869 by-election after the death of William Croke.

LeVesconte retired from politics in 1874 and died in Arichat in 1879.

His grandson, Isaac Duncan MacDougall, later served in the House of Commons.

Electoral record

References 
 
 

1822 births
1879 deaths
People from Saint Brélade
Progressive Conservative Association of Nova Scotia MLAs
Members of the House of Commons of Canada from Nova Scotia
Conservative Party of Canada (1867–1942) MPs